Cyrus Haley (22 September 1832 – 4 October 1875) was a New Zealand arsonist. He was born in Leeds, Yorkshire, England on 22 September 1832 and migrated to Auckland, New Zealand, in 1870.

Haley burned down the Music Hall, the ship City of Auckland, a kerosene store, part of the New Zealand Insurance Company building, and the Choral Hall, which had been built to replace the Music Hall. On 22 January 1872 he fired eight shots into businessman Thomas Russell's home at the Pah farm. He was apprehended by police officer Thomas Broham on 28 January 1872 after setting on fire haystacks at the farm. He was convicted of attempted murder, threatening to kill and threatening to destroy property, and sentenced to life in prison. He was shot dead in 1875 while attempting to escape from a labour gang.

References

1832 births
1875 deaths
People from Leeds
English emigrants to New Zealand
New Zealand arsonists
Criminals from Yorkshire
People convicted of arson
People convicted of attempted murder